The 1988 Campeonato Argentino de Rugby was the 1988 version of the annual rugby competition held in Argentina in 1988.  The winner, for the second consecutive year was Unión de Rugby de Tucumàn, who defeated the Buenos Aires Rugby Union in the final game.

The Campeonato Argentino consisted of 18 teams, divided into two divisions, based on the records of the individual teams.  The top eight qualifiers competed in the final tournament for the title ("Campeonato"), while the others vied in the "Torneo de Classificacion" (qualifying tournament).  At the end of the season, the bottom two teams from the upper division, were demoted to the lower division, while the champion and runner-up from the Torneao de Classification were promoted to the upper division.

Campeonato

Pool A 

Tucumàn and Cordoba advanced to the semi-finals, while Santa Fè was demoted to the lower division.

Pool B 

Buenos Aires and Cuyo advanced to the semi-finals, while Mar del Plata was demoted to the lower division.

Semifinals

Third place play-off

Final

"Classificacion" Tournament

Pool C 

Promoted: Santiago de l'Estero (defeated Noreste in their head-to-dead match).

Pool D 

Promoted: San Juan

Rugby Union in Argentina in 1988

National
 The Buenos Aires Champsionship was won by San Isidro Club
 The Cordoba Province Championship was won by La Tablada
 The North-East Championship was won by Tucumán RC

International
 During 1988, France toured South America, playing eight games against South American Teams, splitting their two matches against the Pumas.  Against the Pumas (managed by Hugo Porta, "Le Coqs" won the first test (18-15) but lost the second 18-6.

 At the end of season, Argentina traveled to France, playing in 8 matches, with a 3-5 record.  They lost both matches against the French national team, 29-9 and 28-18.

External links 
 Memorias de la UAR 1988
  Francesco Volpe, Paolo Pacitti (Author), Rugby 2000, GTE Gruppo Editorale (1999)

Campeonato Argentino de Rugby
Argentina
Rugby